Bo Burnham is the debut album by American comedian, Bo Burnham.  Released on March 10, 2009 by Comedy Central Records, the 2-disc album contains the Compact Disc musical album, and a DVD with Burnham's Comedy Central Presents special, all of his YouTube videos, and other performances.

In a 2009 interview with The A.V. Club, Burnham explained that most songs on the album were similar to his YouTube videos because "I wanted it to still have this very small, homegrown, kid-in-his-bedroom feel. I wanted to show respect for the online community".  The live portions of the album were performed and recorded at Burnham's September 18–21, 2008 gig at the Tempe Improv in Tempe, Arizona.

Track listing
 "I'm Bo Yo"  (Studio) – 3:55
 "My Whole Family..." – 3:58
 The cult hit that "propelled Burnham to Internet stardom"; originally debuted on YouTube, .
 "Bo Fo Sho" – 3:08
 Originally debuted on YouTube, 
 "Love is..." – 3:58
 "The Perfect Woman" – 3:26
 "High School Party" – 2:52
 Burnham recorded an accompanying music video for the iTunes Store in 2008.
 "Klan Kookout" – 2:45
 "New Math" – 3:36
 "I'm Bo Yo" – 3:31
 "A Love Ballad" – 2:33
 "Rehab Center For Fictional Characters" (Studio) – 3:19
 "Welcome To YouTube" (Studio) – 3:33
 Bonus Track – 2:01

DVD
The DVD accompanying Bo Burnham contains an uncensored version of Burnham's Comedy Central Presents episode, the music video for "High School Party", his original videos from YouTube, and his live 10-minute performance at the Tempe Improv.

Reception

Critical response to Bo Burnham has been mostly positive. Punchline magazine's John Delery praised both album and artist, calling the former "hysterical", and the latter as "the sole teenager in America these days that can speak in longhand."  About.com's Patrick Bromley spoke well of Bo Burnham within its genre of musical comedy, saying that while the novelty or shock value of the traditional comedy album wore thin with repeated listenings, Bo Burnham was so dense with wordplay and double entendres that it begged for repeats.  Though Bromley was less generous with Burnham's "edgy humor", he felt the teenaged comedian worked best with his self-deprecating material.

The Recording Industry Association of America (RIAA) certified Bo Burnham gold (video longform, for having sold 50,000 units) on May 27, 2010.

Chart positions

References

 
 

Bo Burnham albums
2009 live albums
Comedy Central Records live albums
Stand-up comedy albums
Spoken word albums by American artists
2000s comedy albums